Bořeň (539 m) is a phonolite hill two kilometres south of Bílina in northwest Bohemia, Czech Republic. When seen from the northwest side, the hill has the shape of a lying lion. It is a structure similar to the Devils Tower in Wyoming, and is the largest phonolite structure of its kind in Europe. Bořen dominates both the town Bílina and the Czech Central Mountains, with its distinctive silhouette visible from a number of remote locations.

There are also mineral water springs which are the source of Bílinská Kyselka water.

References

External links 

 Climbing guide – Stanislav Emingr, Ladislav Vörös
 Virtual panorama from the top of the Bořeň
 Bořeň page, official Czech Central Mountains Park site

Rock formations of the Czech Republic
Mountains and hills of the Czech Republic
Geography of the Ústí nad Labem Region
Teplice District